The Florida Administrative Register (FAR) is the daily publication containing proposed rules and notices of state agencies of Florida.

See also 
 Florida Administrative Code
 Law of Florida
 Federal Register

References

External links 
 Florida Administrative Register from the Florida Department of State

Florida law
United States state official journals